The Agout or Agoût is a  long river in south-western France. It is a left tributary of the Tarn. Its source is in the southern Massif Central, in the Haut-Languedoc Regional Nature Park. It flows generally west through the following department and towns:

 Hérault: La Salvetat-sur-Agout
 Tarn: Brassac, Castres, Lavaur, Saint-Sulpice

The Agout flows into the Tarn at Saint-Sulpice.

Among its tributaries are the Dadou, the Gijou and the Thoré.

References

Rivers of France
Rivers of Occitania (administrative region)
Rivers of Hérault
Rivers of Tarn (department)